Teri Suzanne (born August 18, 1948) is an American bilingual actress, freehand cut paper artist, author, children's songwriter, and creator of the first bilingual family theatre program and theatre group Performing Arts Group (P.A.G) at the Aoyama Theatre in Japan. She is also a producer of English and bilingual multi-media edutainment products, and edutainer with music labels and companies such as Nippon Columbia, Polygon Records, Crayola, Benesse, and SONY Suzanne is known for her television series English in Action produced through NHKsoftware for the Ministry of Science and Education. She was Head of the International Department at the National Children's Castle.

The Tokyo Journal named her as one of 50 foreigners who have made a difference in Japan.

Life and education 
Suzanne was born in Globe, Arizona. She grew up in Southern California and graduated from the University of California Los Angeles with a degree in graphic design and children's puppetry theatre. She later received her masters of education and bilingual education from the University of San Francisco. She was one of the pioneer students to receive a degree in cross cultural education and bilingual specialist credential in this degree program.

Suzanne has two daughters Kunimi Andrea and Mayuka Thaïs who have worked on many of her multi-media bilingual edutainment projects.

Career

Music
Suzanne has worked on 13 albums and numerous singles. In 2004 she recorded Genki Genki Utaou Nontan's bilingual Christmas album for Nippon Columbia along with her daughters Kunimi Andrea and Mayuka Thaïs. Other labels she has worked for include ALC Publishing, Meito, Akachan Honpo, NHKsoftware, and Benesse

Studio releases

Television
Suzanne has been a TV personality for NHKsoftware, NHK, KBS TV, NHK Educational, and SKY PerfecTV!

Bilingual theatre
Suzanne founded the first multi-cultural bilingual group called the Performing Arts Group (P.A.G.) to perform the first bilingual family theatre and family disco productions founded in 1985 in Tokyo, Japan. Their performance and productions were at the Aoyama Theatre in Tokyo, Japan. In the span of 13 years the company produced over 150 shows.

Takashimaya floor design

Suzanne designed Nihonbashi Takashimaya Department store's children's floor.  Suzanne based the floor design on her original bilingual Chidldren's book The Adventures of Shiny and Sparkle. Suzanne created bilingual floor-theme songs, event spaces, staff uniforms, a family membership program, toilets just for kids, a baby snack area, babysitting service and an infant changing and nursing area.

Books
Shiny & Sparkle's Adventure (1989), a bilingual children's book with cassette  
Choki Choki Kids (1998), Iwasaki Shoten, scissor art book 
Katachi wa HAPPY! (1998)
Party! Party! (1998), Iwasaki Publishing

References 

Living people
Singer-songwriters from California
University of California, Los Angeles alumni
1948 births
American women singer-songwriters
Musicians from Los Angeles
University of San Francisco alumni
People from Globe, Arizona
Actresses from Arizona
21st-century American women
Singer-songwriters from Arizona